General Bikram Singh,   (born 19 July 1952) is a retired Indian army officer who served as the  24th Chief of Army Staff (COAS) of the Indian Army. Previously the General Officer Commanding-in-Chief of the army's Eastern Command, he succeeded General V. K. Singh as COAS on May 31, 2012. He retired on 31 July 2014. He is the second Sikh to be COAS, the first having been General J. J. Singh. He was also the Chairman of the Chiefs of Staff Committee (CoSC) of the Indian armed forces.

Military career
Born at Amritsar, he spent his early childhood with his family at Jammu. In 1962, he joined the Punjab Public School, Nabha. The future chief had considered becoming a doctor as he was an exceptional student of Zoology and Biology. But the wars of 1962 and 1965 motivated him to join the NDA in 1968. When asked whether he ever regrets the choice made, Bikram said, "If I were ever to be born again, I would only join the Indian Army."

A graduate of the 40th course at the National Defence Academy, Singh was commissioned into the Sikh Light Infantry on 31 March 1972. On passing out from IMA, he was awarded J&K Rifles Gold Medal in Leadership and Tactics and the Shrinagesh trophy in firing. He was adjudged the 'Best Young Officer' at the Young Officer's course at the Infantry School and was also awarded both the Commando Dagger for being the best commando and the 'Best in Tactics' trophy. He later was an instructor at the Commando and Weapons Wings of the Infantry School.

He is also a  graduate of the Defence Services Staff College, Wellington, Higher Command Course at Army War College, Mhow and US Army War College, Pennsylvania, USA, where he also won the ‘Annual Public Speaking Award’. Later in December 2013, he was inducted into the US Army War College ‘International Fellows Hall of Fame’. On 18 October 2013, he was awarded ‘The Legion of Merit’ by the United States government for exceptionally meritorious conduct in the performance of outstanding services.

The General’s Academic Qualifications include MSc (Defence Studies) from Madras University in 1986, M Phil (Defence & Management Studies) from Devi Ahilya Vishwavidyalaya, Indore in 1997 and Master of Strategic Studies from US Army War College, Carlisle, Pennsylvania, USA in 2004. In addition, the General was conferred with two Honorary Degrees of ‘Doctorate of Science’ by SGGS World University, Punjab in 2016 by the Chief Minister of Punjab and GNDU, Amritsar on 31 May 2018 by the Union HRD Minister Sh. Prakash Javadekar.

Gen Bikram Singh has served in three UN missions in Nicaragua (ONUCA), El Salvador (ONUSAL) and the Democratic Republic of Congo (MONUC). While in the first two missions he was the Chief operations Officer, in MONUC, he was the General Officer Commanding of a Multinational Division in the Democratic Republic of Congo. His Division contributed immensely in the initiation of ‘Goma Peace Process’. During his tenure in Congo, the current Chief of Army Staff of the Pakistan Army Qamar Javed Bajwa served under his command as a brigade commander.

He has been the President of Indian Golf Union from 2012 to 2013 and the President of Indian Polo Association from June 2012 to 31 July 2014

After completing the Higher Command Course, he served his first tenure as a Director in the Military Operations (MO) Directorate. The tenure coincided with the Kargil War and he was the official spokesperson of the Army during that period. He went on to serve four important tenures at Army HQ: an additional tenure in the MO Directorate as the Deputy Director General, two tenures in the Perspective Planning Directorate, as the Deputy Director General of Perspective Planning (Strategy) and later, as the Additional Director General. He was posted back to the Army HQ as a Lieutenant General to serve as the Director General Staff Duties before taking over as Eastern Army Commander. Colleagues remember him for being a 'soldier's soldier' for spending time and working hard with his troops on the ground.

He has held positions of General Officer-Commanding-in-Chief Eastern Command, XV Corps, GOC 10th Infantry Division, Commander of Rashtriya Rifles Sector and GOC of the Multi-National Eastern Division in the Democratic Republic of the Congo. He was wounded while posted as a Brigadier in Jammu & Kashmir, where he has spent much of his service.

Retirement
Bikram Singh retired as Chief of Army Staff on 31 July 2014. He was succeeded by General Dalbir Singh Suhag.
Post retirement he has continuously expressed views on strategic Mountain Strike Corps (MSC), with presentations.

Awards and decorations

Dates of rank

Family
Bikram Singh is married to Surjeet Kaur and the couple has two children.

References

External links

 Bikram Singh Army Chief

Living people
Chiefs of Army Staff (India)
Indian generals
Indian Sikhs
Punjabi people
Recipients of the Param Vishisht Seva Medal
United States Army War College alumni
National Defence Academy (India) alumni
Recipients of the Uttam Yudh Seva Medal
Recipients of the Vishisht Seva Medal
Recipients of the Sena Medal
1952 births
Recipients of the Ati Vishisht Seva Medal
Army War College, Mhow alumni
Defence Services Staff College alumni